Herlin is a surname. People with this name include:

 Antti Herlin (born 1956), Finnish businessman, chairman of KONE
 Auguste-Joseph Herlin (1815–1900), French genre painter from Lille
 Friedrich Herlin (c. 1425/30–1500), German painter
 Fritz Herlen (or Herlin) (before 1449–1491),German artist of the early Swabian school
 Hans Herlin (1925–1994), German novelist
 Jacques Herlin (1927–2014), French character actor
 Olga Herlin (1875–1965), Sweden's first female engraver